Battus may refer to:

Animals
 Battus (butterfly), a genus of butterfly of the family Papilionidae
 Battus (trilobite), a synonym for several agnostid trilobites, now assigned to other genera

Mythology 
 Battus (mythology), a figure in Greek mythology who witnessed Hermes stealing Apollo's cattle. He was punished by being turned into stone.

People 
 Battus of Malta, king of the island of Malta, protector of Anna Perenna in Ovid's Fasti
 Battus I of Cyrene (died 600 BC), founder of the Ancient Greek colony of Cyrenaica and Cyrene
 Battus II of Cyrene, third Greek king of Cyrenaica and Cyrene
 Battus III of Cyrene, fifth Greek king of Cyrenaica
 Battus IV of Cyrene,, seventh Greek king of Cyrenaica
 Hugo Brandt Corstius (1935–2014), Dutch author